Two classes of Greek destroyers were known as the Wild Beast class:

Wild Beast-class destroyer (1912)
Wild Beast-class destroyer (1951)